Huadong is a town of Huadu District, Guangzhou, Guangdong, China. , it has 5 residential communities and 45 villages under its administration.

References

Towns in Guangdong
Huadu District